The Italian general election of 1992 took place on 5 April 1992.

Christian Democracy was by far the largest party in Sardinia, largely ahead of the Italian Socialist Party and the Democratic Party of the Left.

Results

Chamber of Deputies

Source: Ministry of the Interior

Senate

Source: Ministry of the Interior

Elections in Sardinia
1992 elections in Italy
April 1992 events in Europe